Almassora is a town and municipality in the comarca of Plana Alta, Valencian Community, Spain.

Urbanized areas 
 Almassora
 La Platja
 L'Horta
 El Secà
 Polígon industrial

History 
There are ancient Iberian remains within the municipal term. Its present location is from Muslim origin and it is said that the place received its name from Al-Mansur Ibn Abi Aamir 'Almansor', the Caliph of Cordova.

James I of Aragon conquered the town from the saracens in 1234. the municipal charter was given in 1237. In 1616 a channel was built to bring the water from the Millars River to the town And in 1647 the Ermita de Santa Quiteria was built.

Notable people
 Robert Juan-Cantavella
 Javi Costa (Javier 'Javi' Costa Estirado), footballer
 Miguel Ángel Tena, retired footballer

References

External links 

Almassora Town Hall Official Website

Municipalities in the Province of Castellón
Plana Alta